Millard Webb (December 6, 1893 – April 21, 1935) was an American screenwriter and director who directed 20 films between 1920 and 1933. His best-known film is the 1926 silent John Barrymore adventure The Sea Beast, a version of Moby Dick, costarring Dolores Costello. Webb also directed the early sound Florenz Ziegfeld produced talkie Glorifying the American Girl released by Paramount in 1929. In 1927 he directed Naughty but Nice, produced by John McCormick and First National Pictures. His active years were from 1916 to 1933.

He was married to Lydia Stocking (1918–1923). Mary Eaton married Webb in 1929, but they separated.

He was born in Clay City, Kentucky, U.S., and died in Los Angeles, California of intestinal ailment at the age of 40.

Filmography

References

External links 

 
 Millard Webb biog

1893 births
1935 deaths
People from Powell County, Kentucky
American male screenwriters
Film directors from Kentucky
Screenwriters from Kentucky
Eaton family
20th-century American male writers
20th-century American screenwriters